{{Chembox
| Verifiedfields = changed
| Watchedfields = changed
| verifiedrevid = 464365248
| ImageFile_Ref = 
| ImageFile = Benzotriazole - numbered.png
| ImageSize = 160
| ImageAlt = Skeletal formula of benzotriazole
| ImageFile1 = Benzotriazole-3D-spacefill.png
| ImageSize1 = 160
| ImageAlt1 = Space-filling model of the benzotriazole molecule
| PIN = 1H-1,2,3-Benzotriazole
| OtherNames = 1H-Benzotriazole; 1,2,3-Benzotriazole; BTA; BtaH
|Section1=
|Section2={{Chembox Properties
| C=6 | H=5 | N=3
| Appearance = White solid
| Density = 1.36 g/mL<ref name="Merck"></ref>
| MeltingPtC = 100
| MeltingPt_ref =
| BoilingPtC = 350
| BoilingPt_ref =
| Solubility = 20 g/L
| SolubleOther = 
| Solvent = 
| pKa = 8.2
| pKb = > 14
}}
|Section3=
|Section4=
|Section5=
|Section6=
|Section7=
|Section8=
}}

Benzotriazole (BTA) is a heterocyclic compound with the chemical formula C6H5N3. Its five-membered ring contains three consecutive nitrogen atoms. This bicyclic compound may be viewed as fused rings of the aromatic compounds benzene and triazole. This white-to-light tan solid has a variety of uses, for instance, as a corrosion inhibitor for copper.

Structure
Benzotriazole features two fused rings. Its five-membered ring can exist in tautomers A and B, and the derivatives of both tautomers, structures C and D, can also be produced:

Various structural analyses with UV, IR and 1H-NMR spectra indicated that isomer A is predominantly present at room temperature. The bond between positions 1 and 2 and the one between positions 2 and 3 have proved to have the same bond properties. Moreover, the proton does not tightly bind to any of the nitrogen atoms, but rather migrates rapidly between positions 1 and 3. Therefore, the BTA can lose a proton to act as a weak acid (pKa = 8.2) or accept a proton using the lone pair electrons located on its nitrogen atoms as a very weak Brønsted base (pKa < 0). Not only can it act either as an acid or base, it can also bind to other species, utilizing the lone pair electrons. Applying this property, the BTA can form a stable coordination compound on a copper surface and behave as a corrosion inhibitor.

Synthesis and reactions
Synthesis of benzotriazole involves the reaction of o-phenylenediamine, sodium nitrite, and acetic acid. The conversion proceeds via diazotization of one of the amine groups:

The synthesis can be improved when the reaction is carried out at low temperatures (5–10 °C) and briefly irradiated in an ultrasonic bath. Typical batch purity is 98.5% or greater.

Derivatives
Biphenylene and benzyne can be conveniently prepared from benzotriazole by N''-amination with hydroxylamine-O-sulfonic acid. The major product, 1-aminobenzotriazole, forms benzyne in an almost quantitative yield by oxidation with lead(IV) acetate, which rapidly dimerises to biphenylene in good yields.

Applications
Benzotriazole has been known for its great versatility. It has already been used as a restrainer (or anti-fogging agent) in photographic emulsions or developing solutions, and as a reagent for the analytical determination of silver. More importantly, it has been extensively used as a corrosion inhibitor in the atmosphere and underwater. Also, its derivatives and their effectiveness as drug precursors have been drawing attention. Besides all the applications mentioned above, the BTA can be used as antifreezes, heating and cooling systems, hydraulic fluids, and vapor-phase inhibitors as well.

Corrosion inhibition
Benzotriazole is an effective corrosion inhibitor for copper and its alloys by preventing undesirable surface reactions. It is known that a passive layer, consisting of a complex between copper and benzotriazole, is formed when copper is immersed in a solution containing benzotriazole. The passive layer is insoluble in aqueous and many organic solutions. There is a positive correlation between the thickness of the passive layer and the efficiency of preventing corrosion.  BTA is used in conservation, notably for the treatment of bronze disease. The exact structure of the copper-BTA complex is controversial and many proposals have been suggested.

Drug precursor
Benzotriazole derivatives have chemical and biological properties that are versatile in the pharmaceutical industry. Benzotriazole derivatives act as agonists for many proteins. For instance, vorozole and alizapride have useful inhibitory properties against different proteins. Benzotriazole esters are used as mechanism-based inactivators to treat severe acute respiratory syndrome (SARS) by inhibiting the SARS 3CL protease of the SARS-CoV-1 virus. The methodology is not only limited to heterocyclization but was also successful for polynuclear hydrocarbons of small carbocyclic systems.

Environmental relevance
Benzotriazole is fairly water-soluble, not readily degradable and has a limited sorption tendency. Hence, it is only partly removed in wastewater treatment plants and a substantial fraction reaches surface water such as rivers and lakes. It is considered to be of low toxicity and a low health hazard to humans although exhibiting some antiestrogenic properties.

Related compounds
Tolyltriazole is a mixture of isomers or congeners that differ from benzotriazole by the addition of one methyl group attached somewhere on the benzene ring. Tolyltriazole has similar uses, but has better solubility in some organic solvents.

References

Benzotriazoles
Chelating agents
Conservation and restoration materials
Corrosion inhibitors
Photographic chemicals